Damson plum may refer to:

Prunus domestica subsp. insititia, or damson, a subspecies of plum tree
Chrysophyllum oliviforme, a tree of the Caribbean region